Manuel Doreste Blanco (born 31 January 1958 in Puertollano) is a Spanish Olympic sailor in the Soling class. He participated in the 2000 Summer Olympics. He is related to  Gustavo Doreste, José Luis Doreste and Luis Doreste. He won the 1994 Soling World Championships.

References

1958 births
Living people
Olympic sailors of Spain
Real Club Náutico de Gran Canaria sailors
Sailors at the 2000 Summer Olympics – Soling
Spanish male sailors (sport)
Soling class world champions
Sportspeople from Las Palmas